The 2015–16 Moldovan Women Top League season in association football is the 16th since its establishment. A total of 8 teams contested the league.

The season began on 31 August 2015 and ended on 25 May 2016. CS Noroc Nimoreni were the defending champions.

Teams

Format
Teams play each other three times for a total of 21 matches each. After playing 14 matches, the top four teams will play 4 of their remaining 7 fixtures at home.

League table

Results

 Home and away rounds

 3rd leg rounds

References

External links
Women Top League - Moldova - Results, fixtures, tables and news - FMF
League at uefa.com

Moldovan Women Top League seasons
Moldovan Women Top League 2015-16
2015–16 domestic women's association football leagues